Planococcus is a genus of true bugs belonging to the family Pseudococcidae. The genus has a cosmopolitan distribution. A number of species are invasive agricultural pests.

Species 

 Planococcus aemulor
 Planococcus angkorensis
 Planococcus aphelus
 Planococcus bagmaticus
 Planococcus bendovi
 Planococcus boafoensis
 Planococcus cajani
 Planococcus citri
 Planococcus dendrobii
 Planococcus dioscoreae
 Planococcus dischidiae
 Planococcus dubius
 Planococcus epulus
 Planococcus ficus
 Planococcus flagellatus
 Planococcus fungicola
 Planococcus furcisetosus
 Planococcus halli
 Planococcus hosnyi
 Planococcus hospitus
 Planococcus indicus
 Planococcus japonicus
 Planococcus kenyae
 Planococcus kraunhiae
 Planococcus lilacinus
 Planococcus litchi
 Planococcus mali
 Planococcus martini
 Planococcus minor
 Planococcus musae
 Planococcus nigritulus
 Planococcus nilgiricus
 Planococcus orchidi
 Planococcus philippinensis
 Planococcus planococcoides
 Planococcus principe
 Planococcus psidii
 Planococcus radicum
 Planococcus subterraneus
 Planococcus sulawesi
 Planococcus taigae
 Planococcus tanzaniensis
 Planococcus tiomanensis
 Planococcus vovae
 Planococcus zairensis

Species identification 
Identification of mealybug species in the Planococcus genus has been difficult due to an unusually high amount of intraspecies morphological variation. In the 1980s, entomologist Jennifer Cox at the British Museum discovered that the offspring of a single female raised on the same host will develop differently based on environmental conditions. She showed that higher temperatures induced smaller specimens overall with fewer pores, shorter appendages, and shorter setae. From Cox's experiments, the greatest number of tubular ducts in adult females was present at intermediate temperatures, whereas the smallest number were present when temperatures were higher or lower. Cox's work showed that the proposed species Planococcus citricus was in fact a warm temperature variant of Planococcus citri. This created issues in the discrimination of species as these characteristics were among those used by Ezzat & McConnell in their treatment of Planococcus species in 1956. In 1989 Cox revised the genus and listed 35 species. She also created a point-based system to distinguish between Planococcus minor and Planococcus citri based on a matrix of six characters, known as the 'Cox score'. However other morphologically similar species, such as Planococcus ficus and Planococcus halli, a single diagnostic characteristic was not identified. With the improvements in genotyping, efforts to develop different systems to distinguish between cryptic species of Planococcus are ongoing.

References

Pseudococcidae
Sternorrhyncha genera